Kiddinan Sivanesan ( (Kiţţiṇaņ Civaņēcaņ); 21 January 1957 – 6 March 2008) was a Sri Lankan Tamil politician and former Member of Parliament. He was killed by a roadside bomb alleged to have been placed by the Sri Lanka Army's Long Range Reconnaissance Patrol (Deep Penetration Unit).

Early life
Sivanesan was born on 21 January 1957 and spent his early life in Karaveddy, Jaffna District. He studied at Nelliyadi Maththiya Mahaa Viththiyaalayam. He established a number of Palmyrah Development Societies and Coconut Development Societies in Jaffna peninsula. Sivanesan and his family moved to Mallavi when the A9 highway was closed. Between 1996 and 2004 he was general manager of Northern Region Palm Development Co-op Society.

Political career
At the April 2004 parliamentary election Sivanesan was elected to represent the Jaffna District in Parliament.

Assassination
On 6 March 2008 Sivanesan was travelling north along the A9 highway to his home in Mallavi after attending Parliament in Colombo. He crossed the frontline checkpoint at Omanthai, Vavuniya District and entered territory controlled by the Liberation Tigers of Tamil Eelam. Four claymore mines exploded in a row. Sivanesan's driver Periyannan Maheswararajah was killed on the spot. Sivanesan was taken to Maankulam hospital but died of his injuries.

The Tamil National Alliance immediately blamed the Sri Lankan government security forces for the assassination. They claimed that Sri Lankan Army's Long Range Reconnaissance Patrol had carried out the attack. Sivanesan had alleged that he had been harassed by Sri Lankan Army earlier. His vehicle had previously been targeted by claymore mines in 2007. The Army has denied the allegation.

On 7 March 2008 the Tamil Tigers conferred the title Maamanithar (great human being) on Sivanesan.

See also
List of assassinations of the Sri Lankan Civil War

References

1957 births
2008 deaths
Assassinated Sri Lankan activists
Assassinated Sri Lankan politicians
Deaths by firearm in Sri Lanka
Maamanithar
Members of the 13th Parliament of Sri Lanka
Minority rights activists
People murdered in Sri Lanka
Sri Lankan Hindus
Sri Lankan Tamil politicians
Tamil National Alliance politicians